Frederick Dierks Bentley (born November 20, 1975) is an American country music singer and songwriter. In 2003, he signed to Capitol Nashville and released his eponymous debut album. Both it and its follow-up, 2005's Modern Day Drifter, are certified Platinum in the United States, and his third album, 2006's Long Trip Alone, is certified Gold. It was followed in mid-2008 by a greatest hits package. His fourth album, Feel That Fire, was released in February 2009, and a bluegrass album, Up on the Ridge, was released on June 8, 2010. His sixth album, Home, followed in February 2012, as did a seventh one, Riser, in 2014. Bentley's eighth album, titled Black, was released in May 2016, and his ninth, The Mountain, was released in June 2018. His tenth studio album will release in early 2023.

Bentley's studio albums have accounted for 27 singles on the Hot Country Songs and Country Airplay charts, of which 18 have reached No. 1: his debut single, "What Was I Thinkin'", "Come a Little Closer", "Settle for a Slowdown", "Every Mile a Memory", "Free and Easy (Down the Road I Go)", "Feel That Fire", "Sideways", "Am I the Only One", "Home", "5-1-5-0", "I Hold On", "Drunk on a Plane", "Say You Do", "Somewhere on a Beach", "Different for Girls", "Woman, Amen", "Living" and "Beers on Me". Eight more of his singles have reached the top 5.

Early life
Bentley was born on November 20, 1975, in Phoenix, Arizona, as the son of Leon Fife Bentley (August 16, 1923 – June 1, 2012), a bank vice president, and Catherine Childs. His father was born in Glasgow, Missouri, to Richard Thomas Bentley Jr. and Mary Cecile ( Fife) Bentley, and was a First Lieutenant in World War II. His middle name, Dierks (which he now uses as his first name publicly), is also his maternal great-grandmother's surname. He attended Culver Academies in Indiana and graduated from The Lawrenceville School in New Jersey in 1993. Afterward, he spent a year at the University of Vermont (UVM) before transferring to Vanderbilt University in Nashville, Tennessee, where he graduated in 1997.

Music career

2003–05: Dierks Bentley and Modern Day Drifter
Bentley worked at The Nashville Network (now Paramount Network), researching old footage of country performances. During this time, Bentley was banned from the Grand Ole Opry for trespassing on the grounds of the Opry House for research purposes, a ban that would be lifted when Bentley's first album was released. In 2003, Capitol Nashville released Bentley's self-titled debut album. The album's first single, "What Was I Thinkin'", reached No. 1 on the US Billboard Hot Country Songs charts later that year. The next two singles from the album – "My Last Name" and "How Am I Doin'" – reached No. 17 and No. 4, respectively. The album was certified Platinum by the RIAA.

Bentley's second album, Modern Day Drifter, was released in 2005. It spawned two No. 1 singles in "Come a Little Closer” and "Settle for a Slowdown", as well as the No. 3 hit "Lot of Leavin' Left to Do". The album was also certified Platinum.

In 2005, Bentley won the CMA Award for the Horizon Award (now Best New Artist) and was invited to be a member of the Grand Ole Opry. The induction took place on October 1, 2005. Bentley stands as the third-youngest member after Carrie Underwood and Josh Turner.

2006–08: Long Trip Alone and Greatest Hits/Every Mile a Memory 2003–2008

On June 10, 2006, Bentley released his third album, Long Trip Alone. The album produced two No. 1 hits in "Every Mile a Memory" in 2006 and "Free and Easy (Down the Road I Go)" in 2007. The title track reached No. 10 on the country charts, while the fourth single, "Trying to Stop Your Leaving", peaked at No. 5.

In 2007, Bentley released a live DVD titled Live and Loud at the Fillmore, which was filmed in Denver, Colorado.

In a March 2008 interview, Bentley said he would let his fans be the executive producers of his first greatest hits album, Greatest Hits/Every Mile a Memory 2003–2008. The album was released on May 6, 2008. An album cut, "Sweet & Wild", reached No. 51 on the Hot Country Songs chart. The song was an uncredited duet with fellow country singer Sarah Buxton.

2009–10: Feel That Fire and Up on the Ridge

Bentley's fourth studio album, Feel That Fire, was released in February 2009. Its title track, co-written by Brett Beavers and The Warren Brothers, became Bentley's sixth No. 1 hit in February 2009, and the album's second single, "Sideways", became his seventh in summer 2009. The third and final single, "I Wanna Make You Close Your Eyes", peaked at No. 2.

Bentley released his fifth studio album, Up on the Ridge, on June 8, 2010. The title track was released on iTunes on April 20, 2010. The song peaked at No. 21 on the US Billboard Hot Country Songs chart, becoming Bentley's first single to miss the Top 10 since "My Last Name". The second single from the album, "Draw Me a Map", reached No. 33.

2012–13: Home and Country & Cold Cans EP

Bentley's sixth album, Home, was released on February 7, 2012, led by the single, "Am I the Only One", which reached No. 1 on the Billboard Country Singles. The second single off the album is "Home", which was co-written by Bentley, Brett Beavers and Dan Wilson, and also reached No. 1 on March 24, 2012. A third single, "5-1-5-0", was released shortly after "Home" fell from No. 1 on the country chart. Dierks has been quoted by American Songwriter, explaining: "I wrote too many songs. I wrote 70. I wrote a lot. There's 64 that are never going to see the light of day. That's 64 days that I can't get back."

On August 21, 2012, Bentley released the Country & Cold Cans EP on iTunes. It includes five songs, including a radio edit of the track "Tip It On Back" from his album Home. Bentley paid for the studio time to record the EP himself. On October 23, Bentley and Miranda Lambert announced the co-headlined 33-show Locked and Reloaded Tour, which began on January 17, 2013.

2014–2015: Riser
Bentley's seventh album, Riser, was released on February 25, 2014. The album's first single, "Bourbon in Kentucky", was released to country radio on June 10, 2013. It peaked at No. 45 on the Billboard Country Airplay chart, becoming Bentley's lowest-charting single to date. The album's second single, "I Hold On", was released on August 26, 2013, and became his first No. 1 on the Country Airplay chart in April 2014 and his 11th overall to do so. The third single, "Drunk on a Plane", followed that same month and reached No. 1 on Country Airplay in August 2014 and was also a strong commercial hit, reaching No. 27 on the Billboard Hot 100. The album's fourth single, "Say You Do", was released on October 6, 2014; it reached No. 1 on Country Airplay in May 2015. The title track became the album's fifth single in June 2015.

Bentley, along with Eric Paslay, is featured on Charles Kelley's debut solo single, "The Driver", which was released on September 28, 2015. The song received a Grammy nomination for Best Country Duo/Group Performance for the 58th Annual Grammy Awards.

2016–2017: Black
Bentley released his eighth album, Black, on May 27, 2016. The album's first single, "Somewhere on a Beach", was released on January 25, 2016.

Bentley co-hosted the 51st Academy of Country Music Awards on April 3, 2016, where he was also nominated for the Male Vocalist of the Year and Video of the Year awards.

Bentley released a series of four short films for songs from Black, with episode 1 being the song "I'll Be the Moon" featuring Maren Morris. The following episode serves as the video for "What the Hell Did I Say". The album's second single, "Different for Girls" featuring Elle King, was released to country radio on June 6, 2016. It reached No. 1 on Country Airplay in October 2016. The album's title track was released to country radio as the third single on November 14, 2016.

He was also selected as one of 30 artists to perform on "Forever Country", a mashup track of "Take Me Home, Country Roads", "On the Road Again" and "I Will Always Love You", which celebrates 50 years of the CMA Awards.

2018–2021: The Mountain and Hot Country Knights
On June 8, 2018, Bentley released The Mountain, his ninth studio album, via Capitol Records Nashville. All three singles from the album – "Women, Amen", "Burning Man" and "Living" – reached No. 1 (the second of which, however, only being recognized by Mediabase).

Bentley's side project, a '90s country parody band called Hot Country Knights, signed on with Bentley's label Universal Music Group Nashville as a separate recording act in 2020. The act consists of Bentley and his road band, all of whom operate under stage names; Bentley uses the name Douglas "Doug" Douglason. They released their debut single, "Pick Her Up" – which was co-written by Bentley with Jim Beavers and Brett Beavers, and features guest vocals from Travis Tritt – on January 23, 2020.

Bentley released a new single, "Gone", on October 22, 2020. The song was his highest-charting single on the Billboard Hot 100 since his 2003 debut, "What Was I Thinkin'". On July 29, 2021, he released  "Beers on Me" featuring Hardy and Breland. He also joined James Barker Band on the single "New Old Trucks" in October 2021.

2022–present: Gravel & Gold
On July 29, 2022, Bentley released the lead single, "Gold", off his upcoming tenth studio album, Gravel & Gold, set for release on February 24, 2023. On November 19, he released "High Note", a bluegrass track featuring Billy Strings.

Personal life
Bentley married Cassidy Black on December 17, 2005, in Mexico. They live in Nashville with their three children and dog, George. The couple has two daughters and a son. One daughter makes a vocal appearance on the song "Thinking of You" from Bentley's 2012 album, Home, and their son appears in the music video for Bentley's 2019 single, "Living".

Bentley holds a private pilot license. He owns a Cirrus SR22T and flies a Cessna Citation CJ4.

Tours
Headlining

High Times and Hangovers Tour (2006)
Locked and Loaded Tour (2007)
Free and Easy Summer Tour (2007)
Throttle Wide Open Tour (2008)
Up on the Ridge Tour (2010)
Jäegermeister Tour (2011)
Country and Cold Cans (2011)
Country and Cold Cans  (2021)
Riser Tour (2014)  
Sounds of Summer Tour (2015)
Somewhere on a Beach Tour (2016)
What the Hell World Tour (2017)
Mountain High Tour (2018)
Burning Man Tour (2019)
Beers on Me Tour (2021)

Co-headlining
Locked and Re-Loaded Tour (2013) 

Supporting
Guitars, Tiki Bars and a Whole Lotta Love Tour (2004) 
The Road and the Radio Tour (2006)   
Paisley Party Tour (2009)  
American Saturday Night Tour (2009)

Discography

Studio albums
 Dierks Bentley (2003)
 Modern Day Drifter (2005)
 Long Trip Alone (2006)
 Feel That Fire (2009)
 Up on the Ridge (2010)
 Home (2012)
 Riser (2014)
 Black (2016)
 The Mountain (2018)
 Gravel & Gold (2023)

As Part of Hot Country Knights
 The K Is Silent (2020)

Awards and nominations

Grammy Awards

Country Music Association Awards

Other awards

Film and television

References

External links

 
 

1975 births
Living people
American country singer-songwriters
American country guitarists
American male guitarists
American male singer-songwriters
Country musicians from Arizona
Capitol Records artists
Grand Ole Opry members
People from Tempe, Arizona
Vanderbilt University alumni
Musicians from Phoenix, Arizona
Lawrenceville School alumni
21st-century American guitarists
Guitarists from Arizona
21st-century American male singers
21st-century American singers
Culver Academies alumni
Singer-songwriters from Arizona